The 2019–20 Wisconsin Badgers men's basketball team represented the University of Wisconsin–Madison in the 2019–20 NCAA Division I men's basketball season. The Badgers were led by fifth-year head coach Greg Gard and played their home games at the Kohl Center in Madison, Wisconsin as members of the Big Ten Conference.

With a win over Indiana on March 7, 2020, the Badgers earned a share of the Big Ten regular season championship. They finished the season 21–10, 14–6 in Big Ten play to finish in a three-way tie for first place. Their season ended following the cancellation of postseason tournaments due to the coronavirus pandemic.

Previous season
The Badgers finished the 2018–19 season 23–11, 14–6 in Big Ten play to finish in fourth place. In the Big Ten tournament, the Badgers defeated Nebraska in the quarterfinals before losing to Michigan State in the semifinals. They received an at-large bid to the NCAA tournament as the No. 5 seed in the South Region, their 24th trip to the NCAA Tournament. They were upset in the First Round by No. 12-seeded Oregon.

Offseason

Moore family car accident 
In the early morning hours of May 25, 2019, assistant coach Howard Moore and his family were involved in a car accident near Ann Arbor, Michigan that claimed the lives of his wife Jennifer and daughter Jaidyn. Moore was hospitalized for several weeks with severe burns while his son Jerell escaped with minor injuries. After a setback in his home and subsequent stint in the ICU, 46-year-old Moore was moved to a long-term care and rehab facility in July.

On July 31, 2019, Wisconsin named all-time leading scorer Alando Tucker an interim assistant coach to fulfill Moore's coaching duties for the 2019–20 season. Tucker had been serving as the athletic department's director of student-athlete engagement. "Do Moore. Be Moore. 4 Moore" became the 2019-20 team's motto.

Departures

2019 recruiting class

2020 recruiting class

Roster

Season Notes

Micah Potter's eligibility 
A month before the season opener, the NCAA denied Wisconsin's waiver request to allow Micah Potter to compete during the fall semester, arguing he had not sat out a full year after enrolling at Wisconsin. Potter did not play during the 2018–19 season, but stayed in classes at Ohio State before transferring to Wisconsin for the spring 2019 semester.

"I don't understand why I am being punished additionally for doing what is encouraged of a student-athlete," Potter said in a statement released by UW. "The penalty of a third semester to what I have already sat out seems unjust."

Wisconsin continued to appeal Potter's case throughout November. After the final denial, Gard called the situation "unprecedented" and expressed frustration with the NCAA's inconsistency on transfer rulings. "I was hoping common sense would prevail in this," Gard said. "Unfortunately, it didn’t."

Potter made his Badger debut on December 21, 2019 against Wisconsin-Milwaukee after missing the first 10 games of the season.

Circumstances surrounding Kobe King transfer 
On January 25, 2020, the day after a humbling loss to Purdue in which he was held scoreless, sophomore Kobe King informed coaches and teammates via text message that he intended to leave the team. At the time, King was Wisconsin's leading scorer (12.6 ppg) and second in minutes (28.9 mpg) in Big Ten games. King did not travel with the Badgers to Iowa City for the team's next game and publicly announced his decision to transfer two days later, citing unhappiness with the program. King originally committed to Bo Ryan and Wisconsin on September 16, 2015 and reaffirmed his commitment after Gard was hired.

In the aftermath of King's announcement, strength and conditioning coach Erik Helland self-reported an incident in which he repeated a "repugnant word" in front of several players while telling a story from his days on the Chicago Bulls training staff. King admitted mentioning the incident with UW officials during a January 31 meeting. Helland resigned on January 6, 2020 after an investigation by the university.

Schedule and results

|-
!colspan=12 style=| Exhibition

|-
!colspan=12 style=|Regular season

|-
!colspan=9 style=|Big Ten tournament
|-
!colspan=9 style=|Canceled
|-
!colspan=9 style=|NCAA tournament
|-
!colspan=9 style=|Canceled
|-

Rankings

*AP does not release post-NCAA Tournament rankings

Player statistics

References

Wisconsin Badgers men's basketball seasons
Wisconsin
Badgers men's basketball team
Badgers men's basketball team